A Wish for Wings That Work: An Opus Christmas Story is a children's book by Berkeley Breathed that was published in 1991. It was made into an animated television special that same year. The book and special feature characters from Breathed's comic strips Bloom County and Outland.

Plot
The story centers on Opus the Penguin (a main character of all three of Breathed's comic strips, and at the time appearing in Outland). Opus is downhearted because, as a penguin, he cannot fly. He orders a machine and assembles it; when it comes time to test the machine by jumping off a three-mile-high cliff, Opus decides to do something less dangerous, and goes home to make anchovy Christmas cookies. He does not give up on his dream though, and makes a Christmas wish to Santa Claus for "wings that will go!" On Christmas Eve, Santa is making his usual delivery when he loses his reindeer and crashes into a lake. Opus jumps in and uses his natural swimming skills to pull Santa out. To thank Opus for his daring rescue, a group of ducks pick him up and take him flying through the air.

TV special

On December 18, 1991, an animated special based on the book aired on CBS. It was directed by Skip Jones and was produced by Peggy Regan for Steven Spielberg's Amblin Television for Universal Cartoon Studios. It was released on DVD on November 6, 2007.

Voices
 Michael Bell as Opus
 Joe Alaskey - Truffles, The Ducks
 John Byner - Bill
 Tress MacNeille - The Chicken
 Alexaundria Simmons - Ronald-Ann
 Andrew Hill Newman - Santa Claus
 Frank Welker - Additional Voices
 Sudy Nim - The Kiwi
 Dustin Hoffman (uncredited) - Milquetoast the Cross-Dressing Cockroach

Critical reception
Lisa Horowitz of Variety gave the special a positive review, saying that it "crams a lot of action and intelligence into its half-hour." She also praised the animation and vocal performances.

Breathed, who was credited as the writer and executive producer of the special, was disappointed with the overall results. Asked in 2003 in The Washington Post where a copy of the special could be found on VHS or DVD: Breathed replied:

In a 2007 interview, Breathed said that the reason he disliked the special was simply "unspectacular ratings" and that his humor "wasn't meant for television, even if it was done right." He also blamed his own "lack of writing experience, as [he] wrote the script. And the director was way over his head." Breathed said that he had wanted Sterling Holloway to provide the voice for Opus. According to a 2011 Breathed interview, the director inserted numerous inappropriate jokes into the special's background scenes.

References

External links
 Berkeley Breathed's website
 The Washington Post interview, mentions the TV Special
 
 

1991 children's books
Bloom County
Books by Berkeley Breathed
American picture books
Christmas children's books
Little, Brown and Company books
1991 in American television
1991 television specials
1990s American television specials
1990s animated television specials
CBS television specials
Christmas television specials
Animated Christmas television specials
Amblin Entertainment animated short films
Adaptations of works by Berkeley Breathed
Television specials by Universal Cartoon Studios
Books about penguins
Santa Claus in fiction
1990s English-language films